The 2013–14 First League of the Republika Srpska is the eighteenth season of the First League of the Republika Srpska, the second tier football league of Bosnia and Herzegovina, since its original establishment and the eleventh as a second-tier league. It will begin on 17 August 2013 and end on 25 May 2014; a winter break where no matches are played will be in effect between 10 November 2013 and 16 March 2014. Mladost (VO) were the last champions, having won their one championship title in the 2012–13 season and earning a promotion to Premier League of Bosnia and Herzegovina.

Fourteen clubs are participating in this session, ten returning from the previous session, one relegated from Premier League of Bosnia and Herzegovina, two promoted from two regional Second League of the Republika Srpska.

Changes from last season

Team changes

From First League of the RS
Promoted to Premier League
 Mladost (VO)

Relegated to one of 2 respective regional Second League of the RS
 Ljubić (Second League of the RS – West)

To First League of RS
Relegated from Premier League
 ---

Promoted from two regional Second League of the RS
 Napredak (DŠ) (Second League of the RS – East)

Stadions and locations

References

Bos
2013–14 in Bosnia and Herzegovina football
First League of the Republika Srpska seasons